Kurt David Knudsen (born February 20, 1967) is former Major League Baseball pitcher.

External links

1967 births
Living people
American River Beavers baseball players
Baseball players from Illinois
Detroit Tigers players
Major League Baseball pitchers
Sonoma County Crushers players
Bristol Tigers players
Fayetteville Generals players
Lake Elsinore Storm players
Lakeland Tigers players
London Tigers players
Midland Angels players
People from Arlington Heights, Illinois
Phoenix Firebirds players
Toledo Mud Hens players